Couin is a commune in the Pas-de-Calais department in the Hauts-de-France region of France.

Geography
A small farming village located 16 miles (25 km) southwest of Arras at the junction of the D25 and D2 roads, by the banks of the river Authie.

Population

Places of interest
 The church of St.Pierre, dating from the seventeenth century.
 The eighteenth-century chateau.
 Three Commonwealth War Graves Commission cemeteries.
.

See also
Communes of the Pas-de-Calais department

References

External links

 The CWGC cemeteries
 Château de Couin website

Communes of Pas-de-Calais